In Norse mythology, Garmr or Garm ("rag") is a wolf or dog associated with both Hel and Ragnarök, and described as a blood-stained guardian of Hel's gate.

Name
The Old Norse name Garmr has been interpreted as meaning "rag". The etymology of the name remains uncertain. Bruce Lincoln brings together Garmr and the Greek mythological dog Cerberus, relating both names to a Proto-Indo-European root *ger- "to growl" (perhaps with the suffixes -*m/*b and -*r). However, Daniel Ogden notes that this analysis actually requires Cerberus and Garmr to be derived from two different Indo-European roots (*ger- and *gher- respectively), and in this opinion does not establish a relationship between the two names.

Attestations

Poetic Edda
The Poetic Edda poem Grímnismál mentions Garmr:

The best of trees | must Yggdrasil be,
Skíðblaðnir best of boats;
Of all the gods | is Óðinn the greatest,
And Sleipnir the best of steeds;
Bifröst of bridges, | Bragi of skalds,
Hábrók of hawks, | and Garm of hounds.

One of the refrains of Völuspá uses Garmr's howling to herald the coming of Ragnarök:

Now Garm howls loud | before Gnipahellir,
The fetters will burst, | and the wolf run free;
Much do I know, | and more can see
Of the fate of the gods, | the mighty in fight.

After the first occurrence of this refrain the Fimbulvetr is related; the second occurrence is succeeded by the invasion the world of gods by jötnar; after the last occurrence, the rise of a new and better world is described.

Baldrs draumar describes a journey which Odin makes to Hel. Along the way he meets a dog.

Then Óðinn rose, | the enchanter old,
And the saddle he laid | on Sleipnir's back;
Thence rode he down | to Niflhel deep,
And the hound he met | that came from hell.

Bloody he was | on his breast before,
At the father of magic | he howled from afar;
Forward rode Óðinn, | the earth resounded
Till the house so high | of Hel he reached.

Although unnamed, this dog is normally assumed to be Garmr. Alternatively, Garmr is sometimes assumed to be identical to Fenrir. Garmr is sometimes seen as a hellhound, comparable to Cerberus.

Prose Edda
The Prose Edda book Gylfaginning assigns him a role in Ragnarök:
Then shall the dog Garmr be loosed, which is bound before Gnipahellir:  he shall do battle with Týr, and each become the other's slayer.

In popular culture 
Garm appears as a boss fight in both 2017's Hellblade: Senua's Sacrifice and 2022's God of War Ragnarök.

See also
 Hellhound
 List of wolves

Notes

References

 Bellows, Henry Adams (trans.). 1923. The Poetic Edda. New York: The American-Scandinavian Foundation.
 Brodeur, Arthur Gilchrist (trans.). 1916. Snorri Sturluson: The Prose Edda. New York: The American-Scandinavian Foundation.

External links 
 

Creatures in Norse mythology
Mythological dogs
Norse underworld
Wolves in Norse mythology